LSS may refer to:

 L. S. Sheshagiri Rao, Indian writer and scholar of Kannada literature
 Lakeland School System, school district in Lakeland, Tennessee
 Landing Ship Stern Chute, a converted train ferry used early in WW2 as Dock landing ship
 Langstaff Secondary School, Richmond Hill, Ontario
 Large-scale structure of the universe
 Large Space Simulator, Space simulator
 Last Song Syndrome
 Laurel Springs School, Ojai, California, United States
 Lawrence Sheriff School, Rugby, Warwickshire
 Law Society of Saskatchewan
 Lean Six Sigma, a synergized managerial concept of Lean manufacturing and Six Sigma
 Leicester Secular Society, the world's oldest Secular Society
 Licentiate of Sacred Scripture, see Licentiate of Sacred Theology
 Life Saving Society
 Life Span Study of atomic bomb survivors, see Epidemiology data for low-linear energy transfer radiation
 Lithic Studies Society
 Lincoln Square Synagogue, Manhattan, New York City
 Linhard–Scharff–Schiøt theory in ion physics
 Logistics Support System
 London School of Sound, school of music production based in London, United Kingdom
 Lone Star Showdown, the official rivalry between the Texas A&M Aggies and the Texas Longhorns
 Lone Star Steel Company, a tubular steel mill in Lone Star, Texas
 LSS (gene), an enzyme
 LSS (Lynxmotion Smart Servo), a series of hobbyist-grade smart actuators created by RobotShop Inc.
 LSS (film), a 2019 Philippine film
 LSS Data Systems, a medical software company
 Lumbar spinal stenosis, a medical condition in which the spinal canal narrows
 Lunds Studentsångförening, a Swedish male-voice choir
 XM26 Lightweight Shotgun System